is a 2010 Japanese splatter film directed by  Yoshihiro Nishimura. It stars Yumiko Hara and Eihi Shiina, and was written by Nishimura and Daichi Nagisa.

Synopsis
A girl named Kika and her father hide from her mother, Rikka, who has gone insane and resorted to cannibalism, as well as her uncle, Yasushi, who aids his sister in her crimes. They find the two hiding in an abandoned town and incinerate Kika's father to death. Before the homicidal siblings can kill Kika, a meteorite falls from the sky inexplicably and hits Rikka, punching through her and destroying her heart. In her last breath, Rikka rips out Kika's heart and puts it in her chest. Immediately after, an unknown substance encases the two, putting them in cocoon-like states. Black ash emits from Rikka and eventually covers the northern half of Japan. People who inhale the ash are turned into bloodthirsty zombies. In an effort to contain the infection, a large wall is erected, dividing Japan in two, keeping the zombies north while most of the uninfected population remains south.

One year later, Kika is freed from her cocoon-like state and awakens when an artificial heart is put inside her chest to keep her alive. Having been dropped off at the wall, several zombies approach her. With a chainsaw-like katana that shares the power source with her heart, she fights and quickly kills the zombies by severing the horns on their foreheads. Kika rescues a man named Taku and his mute companion, whom he calls No-Name because he does not know her real name. The two collect the zombies' horns, which can be turned into a drug and sell them on the black market in order to get some money to manage to live while fighting zombies. When she sleeps, Kika is woken by pain in her chest, as Rikka is freed from the cocoon and declares herself "queen" of the zombies, and begins commanding them to attack people and places. Some time later, Kika, Taku, and No-name are arrested while attempting to deal the zombie horns, as the horns, other than being drugs, contain a volatile and explosive substance.

Meanwhile, the Prime Minister Hatoda and his supporters protest the killing of zombies, claiming they are still human. The opposing side is led by Justice Minister Osawa and his followers, who believes the monsters must be wiped out before they can overrun all of Japan. When Hatoda makes a speech near the wall, Osawa's men detonate a bomb, destroying a section of the wall, allowing several zombies to come through. Before Hatoda is torn apart by them, he screams out that all zombies are, indeed, no longer human.  Osawa then declares himself as the new prime minister.

The government has managed to identify Rikka as the source of the zombie outbreak. Upon agreeing to track her down, Kika and her companions are freed and supplied with special equipment. After crossing the wall, they are attacked by an unknown assailant using decapitated zombie heads used as crude bombs, but are saved by an ex-cop named Kaito. Shortly after, at a  zombie infested bar, the group finds Maya, No-Name's sister, who is being tortured and fed on by Yasushi himself. The group save her and escape on a car, pursued by Yasushi in a crude vehicle made of zombie body parts. During the chase, Kika kills the zombiefied bar owner, and Taku sacrifices himself to force Yasushi's vehicle over a cliff. Having lost a lot of blood from her torture, Maya dies through the course of the drive, leaving No-Name to sadly mourn over her passing.

Kika, Kaito, and No-Name eventually reach Rikka, who greets them using a giant body made out of zombies. While Rikka tortures Kika by abusing the latter's heart, No-Name fires a tracking signal onto Rikka's location. Osawa commands the army to fire several missiles at Rikka, but she is unfazed and captures two of the missiles, using them to fly the giant body to southern Japan. Kika manages to grab on to the giant, but is confronted by Yasushi, who had survived the crash. After a fight, Kika kicks him into one of the missiles which explodes, killing him. Meanwhile, thousands of zombies on the ground have broken through the wall, attacking the southern half of the country. After being attacked by a zombie, Osawa is killed by his own guards who had believed he became one himself.

With one missile gone, the makeshift zombie plane becomes unstable and veers back to northern Japan. Kika engages her mother in a fistfight. Having gained the upper hand, Kika rips out the heart in Rikka's chest and decapitates her. With the "Queen" dead, all of the zombies fall to the ground dead. As the plane falls apart, Kika almost dies but No-Name and Kaito manage to save her. No longing needing her original heart, Kika crushes it in her hand.

During the end credits, the final missile explodes, launching Rikka's severed head into space. It eventually reaches an alien planet and presumably strikes an inhabitant the same way the meteorite did to Rikka.

Cast

Production
Director Yoshihiro Nishimura began working on the script to Helldriver in 2009. Nishimura took influence from George A. Romero's film Night of the Living Dead which dealt with current events of the day. Nishimura stated that there was "quite a lot of satire and social criticism in this film...I describe what ensues after the nation splits in two, with humans controlling one half and zombies the other, and the kind of discrimination that would occur within Japan were something severe like this to happen."

On May 15, 2010 Helldriver began filming in an abandoned warehouse in Choshi, Japan. Other scenes involving hordes of zombies were filmed outside Mount Fuji.

Release
Helldriver had its world premiere at Fantastic Fest in Austin, Texas on September 28, 2010. It was also an Official Selection at the Sitges International Fantastic Film Festival in 2010, the Brussels International Fantastic Film Festival in 2011, the Calgary International Film Festival in 2011 and Montreal's Fantasia International Festival in 2011.

The film had its theatrical release in Japan on July 23, 2011. The screening of Helldriver at the New York Japan Society in April 2011 was a benefit in aid for the 2011 Tōhoku earthquake and tsunami.

Reception
Film Business Asia gave the film a six out of ten rating, calling it an "average-to-occasionally-inspired effort" that was not as strong as Nishimura's Tokyo Gore Police but better than Vampire Girl vs Frankenstein Girl. The review went on to say that the film "suffers from the perennial problem with all zombie movies: the creatures have only one way of attacking and the heroes have only one way of killing — which soon becomes repetitive unless there's an interesting story or characters." The Hollywood Reporter gave the film a negative review, stating that "Even for a genre film, the storyline is negligible" and the "action choreography is run-of-the-mill." The review went on to praise the make-up in the film, stating that "Nishimura put tender loving care into image and costume design...Even "walk-ons" have distinct facial features and expressions."

References

External links
 

2010 films
2010 horror films
2010s science fiction horror films
Films set in Japan
Films shot in Japan
Japanese science fiction horror films
2010s Japanese-language films
Japanese post-apocalyptic films
Japanese zombie films
2010s Japanese films